Edwin W. Martin Jr. (born September 3, 1931) is a policymaker in the area of education for people with disabilities. He served as congressional committee staff and in the Johnson, Nixon, Ford and Carter administrations. He was instrumental in drafting the Education of All Handicapped Children Act (1975). When the Department of Education was created in 1979–1980, Martin served as the first Assistant Secretary of Education for Special Education and Rehabilitative Services.

Early life and education
Martin earned his PhD from the University of Pittsburgh in Speech Pathology and Psychology. Muhlenberg College, his undergraduate college, Emerson College and Long Island University's C.W. Post College have awarded him honorary degrees.

Public service
Martin began his Washington career by serving as Director of the House of Representatives's ad-hoc Subcommittee on the Handicapped in 1966-67. The subcommittee, Chaired by Rep. Hugh L. Carey of New York, drafted, and saw passed, the first Education of the Handicapped Act, Title VI of the Elementary and Secondary Education Act, (P.L. 89-750).

In 1967 Martin was invited to serve as Deputy Associate Commissioner and Deputy Director of the new Bureau of Education for the Handicapped (BEH) created by Title VI. It was a competitive Civil Service appointment.

In 1969, Martin was promoted to Associate Commissioner and Director of the Bureau, and in 1977 advanced to Deputy Commissioner, remaining Bureau Chief. During these years Martin played a key role in developing federal special education policy, drafting and advising the Congress on multiple pieces of legislation.

In 1975, he was one of a small group of hill staff members and advocates for children who drafted what became P.L. 94-142, the Education of All Handicapped Children Act, a landmark bill in which states promised to educate all their handicapped children to qualify for federal funding for such programming. In 1990, the law became known as the Individuals with Disabilities Education Act (IDEA).

President Carter appointed Martin to serve as the nation's first Assistant Secretary of Education for Special Education and Rehabilitative Services, to head the newly created Office of Special Education and Rehabilitative Services (OSERS). He was confirmed unanimously by the Senate. He served in that role until he was succeeded by President Reagan's appointee, Jean S. Tufts, in October 1981.

In 1981, Martin received the highest accolade of the Council for Exceptional Children, the J. E. Wallace Wallin Award for Lifetime Achievement.

Later career
Leaving the government in 1981, Martin became the President and CEO of three non-profit corporations serving children and adults with disabilities, The National Center for Disability Services on Long Island, New York. The Center has since been renamed The Viscardi Center. Martin's efforts won him invitations to become Lecturer in Education at the Harvard Graduate School of Education and Columbia University's Teachers College.

After retiring, Martin ran for, and won, election for the office of Mayor of Venice, Florida. He served for one three-year term from 2007-2010. He currently writes a blog opposing increased land development in the area, Inside Venice, Florida.

Martin remains an individual of strong influence in special education. He wrote an email to professional friends July 29, 2017:

          'Perspectives on Providing Special Education to Children'

I have had the good and interesting fortune to have taught preschool school, school-aged, and Post-secondary students with special education needs, including some graduate students and faculty members.  In association with other professionals I have worked, learned and taught with physicians, psychologists, social workers, speech pathologists and audiologists, some with disabilities, e.g., deafness, blindness, mental health, physical disabilities, ranging in extent of disability from mild to severe.

I am sharing my thoughts, particularly with those who feel only regular classroom placement is the ideal service delivery system, not because I think I have "the answer," but in hopes that by sharing, we might communicate with additional appreciation of differing views.

There is no way, it seems to me, one can follow the path, I have, without being struck by the unique characteristics, strengths and weaknesses, and the unique needs of individuals.  There are, of course, commonalities, but in the learning/therapy interaction, I found no one-fits-all model. I have worked with individuals, small groups, and larger groups of a dozen or more, trying to achieve differing kinds of growth.

Early in my career I worked with adult individuals who had suffered loss of speech and language from stroke, gun shot, accident, etc. The embraced model of treatment, was one-on-one instruction with an emphasis on the physical formation of sounds and words.  It was called, in those days, "The Medical Model."  My great teacher/mentor, Ollie Backus, began working with groups at the University of Michigan and then at the University of Alabama.  With her support, I began having small groups, two or three usually participate in role playing of simple daily events, purchasing cigarettes or coffee, etc. using whatever speech or gestures came out, not attempting speech drills.  We, clients and staff, were pleased with the results. The interpersonal context eliciting speech, not always accurate, but there was another gain, the clients felt less hopeless, they began to feel they could get by.  Working with others with similar, but unique, problems created a positive environment for learning.

That learning experience and others, with children and adults with a variety of physical, mental, emotional, sensory and neurological abilities and disabilities, informed my teaching and administrative duties in a variety of professional roles, including administering the federal government's programs for initiating, expanding and improving special education and related services for the nation's children with disabilities.

Today, I read with interest the impassioned arguments about a Continuum of Education Placements model and the Inclusion Model, (with various titles and small variations.). I have friends and former colleagues, including parents, who fall along a "Continuum of Beliefs."  I know them to be caring persons.  I also know that others, as long as there have been special education programs, have wanted to find less expensive ways to meet requirements. This is not a new phenomenon, nor is it rare.

     HELPING DRAFT FEDERAL SPECIAL ED LAW

Starting in 1966, as Director of the House Subcommittee on the Handicapped, and continuing until I resigned in 1981, I was part of shaping about one dozen federal laws, from the first EHA, Title VI of ESEA, to PL 94-142 and its implementing regulations which were drafted by the Bureau of Education for the Handicapped, when I was its director.  BEH was staffed by special educators, those from related professions and by persons with disabilities as well as family members. Its collective experience was national and even international in scope, and covered decades of special educational practice.

In addition to our own experience we used dozens of professional experts and parents as consultants, field reviewers of proposals for grants, advisory committee members and more.  Our relationships with CEC, NARC-ARC, NASDSE, TASH, AFT, NEA, PARENTS COALITIONS, NASB, and more expert organizations/affected parties was ongoing and deliberately sought and expanded.

It is from this collective intelligence, as well as from Court decisions and agreements, such as PARC and MILLS, that federal law was built and implemented. Civil Rights provisions joined educational best practice to demand States and school districts, individualize instruction, involve parents, find children needing help, and move away from unnecessarily separated schools and classes, i.e. "Educate children with non-disabled children wherever appropriate."  Free, Appropriate, Public Education, (FAPE) became the central concept of the law.

Having experienced segregated schools and also having seen most children sitting, essentially idly in regular classes, this collective wisdom believed that children should have options, providing various intensities of specially designed instruction by expert special education teachers and supporting therapists.

     POST GOVERNMENT EXPERIENCES

Because of the Bureau's programs and policies, essentially promoting what was then called, "Mainstreaming" along a continuum of placements, some colleagues were surprised, and some even disappointed that I chose to become CEO of a complex of three non-profit corporations serving children and adults with disabilities, including a school, tuition-free,  for children with physical disabilities.

My goals in taking the job included: building Post-secondary and vocational opportunities for young adults, helping them transition into productive employment and/or Post-secondary educations; developing a research and demonstration program that would develop new approaches to those tasks; improve preschool programming by bringing expert consultants in to revise current practices, and examine models of Education for children in the school, consistent with PL 94-142.

As I studied the school I found that the education, paid for by the State of NY as a "state-supported school," was highly successful in academic terms, more students earned Regent and Non-Regent diplomas than did non-disabled students in the same area.  I looked further, asking parents and students to tell me of their educational experiences before attending this school and while enrolled.  I found this special placement was highly valued, particularly the social opportunities the elementary and secondary schools provided.  Students talked of isolation, of being different, unable to play sports, be in the theater, the student government, going to dances, dating, etc.  Parents recounted stories of substandard programs, poor facilities, in-appropriate educational placements, essentially the stories all of us reading this know.

Still, while I no longer considered closing the school I wanted to be sure no child was "sent" to this school, against their or their parents wishes, and we monitored placement decisions by local schools, boards, etc.  I don't recall we found any placements without parent approval, but we monitored carefully.

In addition we began to have discussions with students and parents about transitioning into local schools on a full or part- time basis.  We also formed closer ties with our own vocational trainers and counselors and with local colleges, including ones where we were operating transition models.

     CONCLUSION

I learned a great deal from this special school, that placements are appropriate—not if I or other educators think so, philosophically, but if the educational outcomes are positive and the students feel they are in a positive supporting environment, one where they are valued, and where they feel success.

It is these experiences that make me cautious about the current one-size fits all passion.  I recently saw a very attractive "inclusion class" in a film at a TASH meeting. I have no doubt that was a valuable learning experience for all involved. As filmed, the teacher was extraordinary, sensitive, intelligent and highly skilled. I have no doubt good work is possible in such a setting, as I saw the same kind of teachers in the school I described.

I am aware, however, that not every teacher, in any setting, is well-trained and successful.  I am aware that some children are getting less, not more specially designed instruction, using successful data-based instructional practices.

We must improve teaching and learning.  There is no magic bullet in "inclusion" or all special settings.  We must avoid "throwing out the baby because the bath water is not as clear as we would wish."

References

Bibliography
 
President Jimmy Carter wrote of this book, "For the current generation of special education scholars, this book provides a valuable report on serious challenges in meeting the needs of the disadvantaged, and provides examples of how noble efforts can be successful."

External links
 The Viscardi Canter, formerly the National Center for Disability Services.

Living people
1931 births
Muhlenberg College alumni
American disability rights activists
Carter administration personnel